Malik Berthelsen is a Greenlandic politician serving as the Mayor of Qeqqata, chairman of the Qeqqata municipal council, and a former member of the Parliament of Greenland, the Inatsisartut.

Political career
From 2009 to 2013, Berthelsen was a member of the Inatsisartut.

In the 2017 Greenlandic local elections, Berthelsen was elected mayor of Qeqqata, succeeding Hermann Berthelsen who had previously been mayor since 1999.

Berthelsen has focused on transportation and has been a proponent of the construction of a road would connect Sisimiut to Kangerlussuaq. This would be Greenland's first ever road project linking one settlement to another.

References

Year of birth missing (living people)
Mayors of places in Greenland
Members of the Parliament of Greenland
Siumut politicians
Living people
People from Sisimiut